Hoovu Hannu is a 1993 Indian Kannada-language drama film based on the novel by Triveni of the same name. The film stars Lakshmi, Rajesh Gundurao, Vyjayanthi and Baby Shamili. It was directed by Rajendra Singh Babu and produced by Vaibhava Lakshmi Productions. The music and lyrics were written and composed by Hamsalekha. The film was a musical hit and won many awards including the Karnataka State Film Awards and Filmfare Awards South. Veteran cinematographer V. K. Murthy worked in this film and won many accolades for his work.

Cast
 Lakshmi as Ramabai
 Baby Shamili as Triveni
 Shankar Ashwath
 Pramila Joshai as Mother Philomena
 Rajesh Gundurao as Kannada lecturer 
 Bharathi
 Rekha Das

Plot
The story revolves around a woman played by Lakshmi who undergoes pain in every step she takes and is forced in prostitution racket to earn a livelihood. Her grand daughter, played by Shamili, comes to her rescue in the latter half of the film.

Soundtrack

Hamsalekha composed the music for the soundtracks also writing their lyrics. The album consists of seven soundtracks. The song 'Thayi Thayi' was reused in the 2008 Kannada film Vamshi, which also starred Lakshmi.

Awards
Karnataka State Film Awards 1993-94
 Special Award By Jury – Vaibhava Lakshmi Productions
 Karnataka State Film Award for Best Actress – Lakshmi

41st Filmfare Awards South -1993
 Filmfare Award for Best Director – Kannada
 Filmfare Award for Best Actress – Kannada

References

External links
 
 

1993 films
1990s Kannada-language films
Films based on Indian novels
Films scored by Hamsalekha
Films directed by Rajendra Singh Babu
Kannada literature